Llanrug United F.C. are a football team who play in the North Wales Coast West Football League Premier Division. They play home games at Eithin Duon, Llanrug.

Current squad

Staff
 Manager:  Aled Owen
 Assistant Manager:  Kevin Wyn Owen
 Secretary:  Dylan Edwin Jones
 Treasurer:  Iwan Rhys Parry
 Physio:  Alun Pierce
 Reserves Fixture Sec:  Iwan Machno Lloyd
 Reserves Manager:  Phil Lynes

External links
Official Website

Welsh Alliance League clubs
Football clubs in Wales
1922 establishments in Wales
Gwynedd League clubs
Association football clubs established in 1922
North Wales Coast Football League clubs
Caernarfon & District League clubs
Bangor & District League clubs